Springfield Township is located in Sangamon County, Illinois. It is made up of unincorporated areas bordering on the city of Springfield, which should not be confused with the township. As of the 2010 census, its population was 6,245 and it contained 3,099 housing units.

Geography

Cities, Towns, Villages
Grandview
Springfield (small portion)

Demographics

References

External links
City-data.com
Illinois State Archives

Townships in Sangamon County, Illinois
Springfield metropolitan area, Illinois
Townships in Illinois